The 2008–09 season was the 110th season of competitive league football in the history of English football club Wolverhampton Wanderers. They played the season in the second tier of the English football system, the Football League Championship. The season turned out to be a major success as the club finished top of the division and were therefore promoted back to the Premier League after a five-year absence.

The team enjoyed their best start to the season for almost fifty years, winning seven of their opening eight games and scoring 23 goals in the process. They led the table continuously from October until the season's end, when they were crowned champions, winning their first silverware in 20 years. Leading goalscorer Sylvan Ebanks-Blake also finished as the division's top scorer for a second consecutive season.

Season review
The close season saw the club continue their policy of signing young players with potential from the lower leagues, rather than pursuing their heavy investment strategy of early times. The close season saw the likes of Richard Stearman, David Jones and Sam Vokes arrive, along with the experience of Chris Iwelumo, while making a transfer profit with the sale of players such as Seyi Olofinjana, Jay Bothroyd and Freddy Eastwood. The squad was also boosted by retaining their most valuable assets in Wayne Hennessey, Michael Kightly and the division's top goalscorer of last season, Sylvan Ebanks-Blake.

The season saw the club's strongest start since 1949–50, as a draw away to Plymouth preceded two runs of seven consecutive wins — scoring 23 goals and conceding only seven goals in the first eight games. Transfer deadline day saw the club add further defensive strength as three new defenders joined the ranks — George Friend, Matt Hill and Jason Shackell. Although their winning streak was ended by a 3–0 home defeat to promotion rivals Reading, as well as a 5–2 defeat at Norwich, which saw Wolves surrender top spot to Birmingham City, Wolves rediscovered their winning form for the second run of seven consecutive wins to lead the table at Christmas.

After drawing their final two fixtures of 2008, Wolves endured a dismal start to 2009, winning just once in eleven league fixtures. Trying to arrest this slump, the January transfer window saw the arrival of three new faces: Kyel Reid and Nigel Quashie on loan for the remainder of the season from West Ham United; defender Christophe Berra also joined from Scottish club Hearts for £2.3million. The FA Cup had brought some cheer with a fringe squad winning 2–0 at local rivals Birmingham in the 3rd Round, before the club exited the competition with a 2–1 home defeat to Premier League side Middlesbrough.

Weathering their bad run of league form, Wolves managed to regain an air of consistency, reinventing their game from the free-flowing, free-scoring football of the first third of the season to hold down a string of clean sheets and one goal margin victories against Crystal Palace and Sheffield Wednesday. With promotion rivals Birmingham City and Reading unable to take advantage of their poor run, March saw an upturn in Wolves' league form as the club took 13 points from a possible 15, strengthening their position at the top of the table that they had led since October.

With just seven games left on the Championship calendar, Aston Villa striker Marlon Harewood was loaned for the run-in, though the team were also hit by the news that key midfielder Michael Kightly would miss the remainder of the season after suffering a broken metatarsal in his foot. Further injury woe struck when Chris Iwelumo suffered medial ligament damage in a loss to local rivals Birmingham in April that ended a five-game unbeaten run. 

However, Easter weekend brought 3–0 home win against struggling Southampton, followed by a 3–2 away victory at Derby County that gave Wolves a seven-point lead over third-placed Sheffield United. Promotion to the Premier League was confirmed on 18 April 2009 when a goal from Ebanks-Blake gave Wolves a 1–0 win over Queens Park Rangers. Seven days later, Wolves clinched their first league title since the 1988–89 season — and their first title at second-tier level since 1976–77 — after a 1–1 draw at Barnsley brought the point they required for the title.

Wolves completed their season with a 1–0 home win over Doncaster Rovers, after which they were presented with the Championship trophy to crown their most successful season in decades as they returned to the top flight after a five-year absence.

Results

Pre season
Wolves conducted a short three-match tour of Scotland, their first visit in three years. As had become common in recent years, only their final game was held at their Molineux home. A second "Wolves XI" team largely comprising academy prospects and out of favour senior players also played a series of matches during this period.

"Wolves XI" pre season results (all away): 4–1 v Chasetown (18 July), 1–2 v Rhyl (26 July), 2–0 v Stafford Rangers (5 August)

Football League Championship

A total of 24 teams competed in the Championship in the 2008–09 season. Each team would play every other team twice, once at their stadium, and once at the opposition's. Three points were awarded to teams for each win, one point per draw, and none for defeats. The provisional fixture list was released on 16 June 2008, but was subject to change in the event of matches being selected for television coverage.

Final table

Results summary

Results by round

FA Cup

League Cup

Players

Statistics

|-
|align="left"|||align="left"|||align="left"| 
|||0||2||0||1||0||||0||0||1||
|-
|align="left"|||align="left"|||align="left"|  
|||||2||0||2||0||||||||1||
|-
|align="left"|||align="left"|||align="left"| 
|||0||0||0||1||0||||0||0||0||
|-
|align="left"|||align="left"|||align="left"| 
|||||2||0||2||0||||||||0||
|-
|align="left"|||align="left"|||align="left"| 
|||||1||0||2||0||style="background:#98FB98"|||||||1||
|-
|align="left"|||align="left"|||align="left"|  (c)
|17||||0||0||0||0||17||||||0||
|-
|align="left"|||align="left"|||align="left"| 
|||||||0||1||0||||||||0||
|-
|align="left"|||align="left"|||align="left"| 
|||0||2||0||2||0||||0||12||0||
|-
|align="left"|||align="left"|FW||align="left"| 
|41||25||||0||||0||||25||||0||
|-
|align="left"|10||align="left"|FW||align="left"| 
|||||||1||||0||||||||0||
|-
|align="left"|11||align="left"|||align="left"| 
|||0||1||0||1||0||||0||||0||
|-
|align="left"|12||align="left"|||style="background:#faecc8" align="left"| 
|0||0||0||0||0||0||0||0||0||0||
|-
|align="left"|13||align="left"|||style="background:#faecc8" align="left"| 
|0||0||0||0||0||0||0||0||0||0||
|-
|align="left"|14||align="left"|||align="left"| 
|||||2||0||||0||style="background:#98FB98"|||||||0||
|-
|align="left"|15||align="left"|||align="left"|  ¤
|0||0||0||0||0||0||0||0||0||0||
|-
|align="left"|16||align="left"|||align="left"|  ¤ †
|0||0||0||0||||1||||||0||0||
|-
|align="left"|16||align="left"|||align="left"| 
|15||0||0||0||0||0||style="background:#98FB98"|15||0||4||0||
|-
|align="left"|17||align="left"|||align="left"| 
|||||1||0||0||0||||||0||0||
|-
|align="left"|18||align="left"|FW||align="left"| 
|||||2||2||1||0||style="background:#98FB98"|||||0||0||
|-
|align="left"|19||align="left"|FW||align="left"|  
|||14||||0||||2||style="background:#98FB98"|||16||||1||
|-
|align="left"|20||align="left"|||align="left"|  ¤
|0||0||0||0||0||0||0||0||0||0||
|-
|align="left"|21||align="left"|||align="left"|  ¤
|0||0||0||0||1||0||||0||0||0||
|-
|align="left"|22||align="left"|||align="left"|  ¤
|||0||1||0||0||0||style="background:#98FB98"|||0||0||0||
|-
|align="left"|23||align="left"|||align="left"|  ¤
|||0||0||0||1||0||||0||0||0||
|-
|align="left"|24||align="left"|||align="left"|  †
|0||0||0||0||0||0||0||0||0||0||
|-
|align="left"|24||align="left"|||style="background:#faecc8" align="left"| 
|||0||0||0||0||0||style="background:#98FB98"|||0||0||0||
|-
|align="left"|24||align="left"|||style="background:#faecc8" align="left"| 
|||||1||0||0||0||style="background:#98FB98"|||||0||0||
|-
|align="left"|25||align="left"|||align="left"|  ¤ 
|0||0||0||0||0||0||0||0||0||0||
|-
|align="left"|26||align="left"|FW||align="left"|  †
|0||0||0||0||||0||||0||0||0||
|-
|align="left"|26||align="left"|||align="left"|  
|13||0||1||0||0||0||style="background:#98FB98"|14||0||||0||
|-
|align="left"|27||align="left"|||style="background:#faecc8" align="left"|  
|||0||0||0||0||0||style="background:#98FB98"|||0||||0||
|-
|align="left"|27||align="left"|FW||style="background:#faecc8" align="left"|  
|||0||0||0||0||0||style="background:#98FB98"|||0||0||0||
|-
|align="left"|28||align="left"|||align="left"| 
|||0||1||0||0||0||style="background:#98FB98"|||0||0||0||
|-
|align="left"|29||align="left"|||align="left"|  ¤ 
|0||0||0||0||0||0||0||0||0||0||
|-
|align="left"|30||align="left"|||align="left"| 
|12||0||0||0||1||0||13||0||0||0||
|-
|align="left"|31||align="left"|||align="left"| 
|0||0||0||0||0||0||0||0||0||0||
|-
|align="left"|31||align="left"|||style="background:#faecc8" align="left"| 
|0||0||0||0||0||0||0||0||0||0||
|-
|align="left"|32||align="left"|||align="left"| 
|45||||0||0||2||0||47||||||0||
|-
|align="left"|33||align="left"|||align="left"|  ¤ †
|||||0||0||2||0||||||0||0||
|-
|align="left"|34||align="left"|||align="left"|  ¤
|0||0||0||0||0||0||0||0||0||0||
|-
|align="left"|35||align="left"|||align="left"|  ¤
|0||0||0||0||0||0||0||0||0||0||
|-
|align="left"|36||align="left"|||align="left"|  ¤ †
|0||0||0||0||0||0||0||0||0||0||
|-
|align="left"|36||align="left"|||style="background:#faecc8" align="left"| 
|||0||0||0||0||0||style="background:#98FB98"|||0||0||0||
|-
|align="left"|37||align="left"|FW||align="left"|  ¤
|0||0||0||0||0||0||0||0||0||0||
|-
|align="left"|38||align="left"|||align="left"|  ¤
|0||0||0||0||0||0||0||0||0||0||
|-
|align="left"|39||align="left"|||align="left"| 
|0||0||0||0||0||0||0||0||0||0||
|-
|align="left"|40||align="left"|||align="left"|  ¤
|0||0||0||0||0||0||0||0||0||0||
|-
|align="left"|41||align="left"|FW||align="left"|  ¤
|||0||0||0||0||0||style="background:#98FB98"|||0||0||0||
|-
|align="left"|43||align="left"|MF||align="left"| 
|0||0||0||0||0||0||0||0||0||0||
|-
|align="left"|44||align="left"|||align="left"|  
|0||0||0||0||0||0||0||0||0||0||
|-
|align="left"|45||align="left"|||align="left"|  ¤ 
|0||0||0||0||0||0||0||0||0||0||
|}

Awards

Transfers

In

Out

Loans in

Loans out

Management and coaching staff

Kit
The season saw a new home and away kit, both manufactured by Le Coq Sportif. The away kit was all black with minor neon green piping. Chaucer Consulting sponsored the club for a fifth and final season.

References

2008–09 Football League Championship by team
2008-09